Joseph Deane Bourke, 3rd Earl of Mayo (1736 – 20 August 1794) was an Irish peer and cleric who held several high offices in the Church of Ireland including Bishop of Ferns and Leighlin (1772–82) and Archbishop of Tuam (1782–94).

Family
Bourke was the second son of John Bourke, 1st Earl of Mayo and Mary Deane. In 1760, he married Elizabeth Meade, the daughter of Richard Meade, 3rd Baronet and Catherine Prittie. They had four sons: John Bourke, 4th Earl of Mayo, Richard, Joseph, and George, and six daughters: Catherine, Mary-Elizabeth, Mary-Anne, Charlotte, Louisa, and Theodosia-Eleanor. Theodosia's son, Matthew Hale, was the first Bishop of Perth and then the Bishop of Brisbane.

Ecclesiastical career

Prior to his elevation to the episcopate, Bourke's earlier ecclesiastical appointments were Prebendary of Armagh (1760–1768); Dean of Killaloe (1768–1772), Rector of Kilskyre, near Kells, County Meath (1769–1772); and Dean of Dromore (1772).

He was nominated as the Bishop of Ferns and Leighlin on 7 September 1772 and appointed by letters patent on 19 September 1772. He was consecrated at St. Thomas's Church, Dublin on 11 October 1772; the principal consecrator was John Cradock, Archbishop of Dublin, and the principal co-consecrators were Charles Jackson, Bishop of Kildare and William Newcome, Bishop of Dromore. 

Ten years later, he was translated to the Archbishopric of Tuam by letters patent on 8 August 1782. On the death in 1792 of his brother, John Bourke, 2nd Earl of Mayo, he succeeded as the 3rd Earl of Mayo.

He died at Kilbeggan in County Westmeath on 20 August 1794, and was interred in the burying ground of his family near Naas, County Kildare.

Arms

References

Bibliography

External links
Joseph Deane Bourke, 3rd Earl of Mayo (1740?–1794), Archbishop of Tuam (National Portrait Gallery)

1740 births
1794 deaths
Deans of Killaloe
Deans of Dromore
Ordained peers
Bishops of Ferns and Leighlin
Bourke
Joseph
Members of the Irish House of Lords
Earls of Mayo
Irish Anglican archbishops